Abdul Rahman Said Simai (born 8 March 1991) is a Tanzanian male weightlifter, competing in the 77 kg category and representing Tanzania at international competitions. He participated at the 2014 Commonwealth Games in the 77 kg event, but he did not finish the event.

Major competitions

References

External links 
 

1991 births
Living people
Tanzanian male weightlifters
Place of birth missing (living people)
Weightlifters at the 2014 Commonwealth Games
Commonwealth Games competitors for Tanzania